Johanna Elizabeth Braddy (born August 30, 1987) is an American actress. She played the leading role in the 2009 horror film The Grudge 3, and has appeared in Hurt (2009), Easy A (2010), Paranormal Activity 3 (2011), and The Levenger Tapes (2011). She starred as Jenny Matrix in the web series Video Game High School from 2012 to 2014. In 2015, Braddy co-starred as Anna Martin in the Lifetime dark comedy-drama series Unreal. She also starred as Shelby Wyatt in the ABC thriller series Quantico.

Early life
Braddy was born in Atlanta, Georgia; the daughter of Jo Beth, a preschool music teacher and a vocalist, and Steve Braddy, an engineer. Braddy has one brother, Cole Braddy. Braddy attended McIntosh High School in Peachtree City, Georgia, and graduated in 2005.

Career
Braddy made her screen acting début in the ABC Family television film Pop Rocks playing Olivia Harden. She made her voice acting debut in Avatar: The Last Airbender playing the role of Princess Yue. Braddy also played small parts in films Broken Bridges, Home of the Giants and Whore. On television, she had recurring roles in the FX drama The Riches, ABC Family teen comedy-drama, Greek, and VH1 soap Hit the Floor. She also guest starred on Cold Case, Southland, CSI: Crime Scene Investigation, Suburgatory, and Shameless.

In 2009, Braddy had her first leading role in the  horror film The Grudge 3, a third installment  in The Grudge franchise, released direct-to-video. The following year, she played a supporting role in the teen comedy Easy A starring Emma Stone. She had roles in horror films Hurt, The Levenger Tapes, Paranormal Activity 3, and The Collection. From 2012 to 2014, she co-starred in the web series Video Game High School.

In 2013, Braddy was cast opposite Constance Zimmer and Shiri Appleby in the Lifetime dark comedy-drama, Unreal. The series premiered on June 1, 2015 with positive reviews from critics. Also in 2015, Braddy was cast as a series regular in the ABC thriller Quantico along with Priyanka Chopra, Yasmine Al Massri, Graham Rogers, Jake McLaughlin and Aunjanue Ellis.

Personal life 
Braddy married her co-star from Video Game High School, Josh Blaylock, on November 11, 2012. Near the end of June 2015, Braddy confirmed their divorce via Twitter, though the exact date of their divorce is unknown. Braddy began dating her Unreal co-star, Freddie Stroma, in the summer of 2015. Braddy and Stroma became engaged in May 2016 and married on December 30, 2016, in Atlanta, Georgia.

Filmography

Film

Television

References

External links

1987 births
Living people
21st-century American actresses
Actresses from Atlanta
American child actresses
American film actresses
American television actresses
American voice actresses
People from Peachtree City, Georgia